Baş Layısqı (also, Baş Layski, Bash Layski, Bash-Laiski, and Bash-Layisk) is a village and municipality in the Shaki Rayon of Azerbaijan.  It has a population of 2,014. It is located next to Qakh and Dagestan (Russian federation). The landscape is mountainous. There are two schools, one hospital, and one mosque.

References 

Populated places in Shaki District